Athymoris is a genus of moth in the family Lecithoceridae.

Species
Athymoris aurantiella Park, 2000
Athymoris dibaliodes Park, 2010
Athymoris liukueiensis Park, 2000
Athymoris martialis Meyrick, 1935
Athymoris paramecola Wu, 1996
Athymoris phreatosa (Wu, 1994)
Athymoris subtrigona Park, 2000

References

 
Torodorinae
Taxa named by Edward Meyrick
Moth genera